John Foley is an American former billionaire and business executive who co-founded Peloton. He has also served as a president of Barnes & Noble. After leaving Peloton, Foley founded Ernesta, a rug company.

Born in 1971, Foley received the Bachelor of Science in Engineering from Georgia Tech and the Master of Business Administration from the Harvard Business School.

References

Living people
1971 births
Former billionaires
American company founders
Georgia Tech alumni
Harvard Business School alumni